The 2011 CAF Champions League Final was the final of the 2011 CAF Champions League, the 47th edition of Africa's premier club football tournament organized by the Confederation of African Football (CAF), and the 15th edition under the current CAF Champions League format.

The final was played between Wydad AC from Morocco and Espérance ST from Tunisia.
After a goal-less first leg, Espérance ST won the second leg 1–0 to win their second African title (the first being the 1994 African Cup of Champions Clubs). The win saw Espérance ST complete the Treble, and as a result, Espérance ST qualified to enter the quarterfinals of the 2011 FIFA Club World Cup as the CAF representative, as well as participate in the 2012 CAF Super Cup against the winner of the 2011 CAF Confederation Cup.

Qualified teams
In the following table, finals until 1996 were in the African Cup of Champions Club era, since 1997 were in the CAF Champions League era.

Venues

Mohamed V Stadium

Mohammed V Stadium is part of a big athletic complex situated in the heart of the city of Casablanca, Morocco, in the western part of the Maarif neighborhood. It was inaugurated March 6, 1955, and currently has a capacity of 67,000.

Often hosting the games of the Morocco national football team, the Mohammed V Stadium is equally known as the home of Wydad AC and Raja CA. It is named after King Mohammed V of Morocco.

Mohammed V Stadium is located right in the centre of the city of Casablanca, the international airport of Casablanca is 25 kilometres from the stadium, and the Casa-Voyageurs rail station is 5 kilometres from the stadium. The stadium has a parking lot with a capacity of 1,000 cars.

It currently has a semi-artificial lawn of a high standard.

Stade Olympique de Radès

Stade Olympique de Radès is a multi-purpose stadium in Radès, Tunisia about 10 kilometers south-east of the city center of Tunis, in the center of the Olympic City. It is currently used mostly for football matches and it also has facilities for athletics.  The stadium holds 60,000 and was built in 2001 for the 2001 Mediterranean Games  and is considered to be one of the best stadiums in Africa. The stadium was built for the 2001 Mediterranean Games, the 60,000-seat covered area covers 13,000 m2 and consists of a central area, 3 adjoining grounds, 2 warm-up rooms, 2 paintings and an official stand of 7,000 seats. The press gallery is equipped with 300 desks.

Club Africain and ES Tunis play their major league matches here. Before the construction of this stadium, the Tunis derby used to be played in the 45,000 seat-capacity Stade El Menzah. It is also the stadium of Tunisia national football team since 2001.

This stadium has hosted matches of the 2004 African Cup of Nations which was won by the Tunisian team.

Road to final

* TP Mazembe won 2–1 on aggregate, but were later disqualified for fielding an ineligible player in the first round. As a result, Wydad Casablanca played against Tanzanian side Simba, which lost to TP Mazembe in the first round, in a play-off for a place in the group stage.

Format
The final was decided over two legs, with aggregate goals used to determine the winner. If the sides were level on aggregate after the second leg, the away goals rule would have been applied, and if still level, the tie would have proceeded directly to a penalty shootout (no extra time is played).

First leg

Second leg

References

External links
CAF Champions League
2011 CAF Champions League Final at Soccerway

2011
Final
CCL
CCL
Sports competitions in Radès
21st century in Radès